Krishnayapalem is a village of the Indian state of Andhra Pradesh. It is a denotification as gram panchayat in Mangalagiri mandal of Guntur district.

Geography 

Demographics 

The average literacy rate stands at 69.52 percent.

Government and politics 

Krishnayapalem gram panchayat is the local self-government of the village. It is divided into wards and each ward is represented by a ward member. In 2013, the then sarpanch of the gram panchayat was awarded Nirmala Grama Puraskaram. The village forms a part of Andhra Pradesh Capital Region and is under the jurisdiction of APCRDA.

Education 

As per the school information report for the academic year 2018–19, the village has a total of 2 Zilla Parishad/MPP schools.

Transport 

Krishnayapalem is located on Vijayawada – Amaravati and Amaravati – Thulluru – Mangalagiri route. APSRTC run buses offers transport services in the route.

See also 
 List of villages in Guntur district

References 

Neighbourhoods in Amaravati